Monica Puig was the defending champion, having won the event in 2012, but she decided to participate at the 2013 HP Open.

Mirjana Lučić-Baroni won the tournament, defeating An-Sophie Mestach in the final, 6–4, 6–2.

Seeds

Main draw

Finals

Top half

Bottom half

References 
 Main draw

Open Gdf Suez de Touraine - Singles